Raorchestes resplendens, the resplendent shrubfrog, is a critically endangered species of frog belonging to the family Rhacophoridae endemic to the high altitude region around the south Indian peak of Anaimudi. It has extremely short limbs and numerous macroglands and was discovered from the Anamudi summit (2695 m asl) in the Western Ghats of Kerala, India and is known only from the Eravikulam National Park.

Description
Individuals of the species are distinguishable from all members of the genus by their bright reddish orange colour and multiple prominent glandular swellings present laterally behind the eyes, on the side of the dorsum, on the anterior side of the vent, on the dorsal side of forearm and shanks and on the posterior side of the tarsus and metatarsus. The limbs are much shorter than in other Raorchestes. The iris is red.

Distribution
The species was initially thought to live within three km2 on the Anamudi summit within the Eravikulam National Park, India but researchers found another site about 20 km away within the same national park.

Etymology and systematics
The genus Raorchestes is named in honour of C. R. Narayan Rao in recognition of his contribution to Indian batrachology. The scientific nomen Orchestes is based on the first generic nomen coined for frogs of the Philautus group, Orchestes Tschudi 1838. The specific epithet resplendens is a Latin term meaning 'bright coloured, glittering, resplendent' referring to the bright red or orange pigmentation.

While Raorchestes resplendens are morphologically striking and different from other Raorchestes, molecular phylogenetics place them clearly within that genus. This suggests rapid morphological evolution in Raorchestes resplendens.

Behaviour
Raorchestes resplendens have very short limbs, and the species is characterized by pronounced crawling behaviour. It is a ground-dwelling species, while most Raorchestes are typically found on vegetation above the ground, some of them being arboreal.

Raorchestes resplendens females burrow their eggs under the moss-covered forest floor, deep inside the base of bamboo clumps. As mature eggs were found in the oviduct of a female after oviposition, females of this species may mate with more than one male and breed more than once in a single season. Parents do not tend their eggs after oviposition. As is typical for the genus, development is direct, without a free-swimming larval stage. Hatching takes place after about 3–4 weeks.

References

External links

 

resplendens
Endemic fauna of the Western Ghats
Frogs of India
Amphibians described in 2010
Taxa named by Sathyabhama Das Biju